George Godfrey (II) The Leiperville Shadow (January 25, 1897 – August 13, 1947) was the ring name of Feab Smith Williams, a heavyweight boxer from the state of Alabama who fought from 1919 to 1937. He named himself after George "Old Chocolate" Godfrey, a Black Canadian boxer from the bare-knuckle boxing days who had been a top name during the John L. Sullivan era. Old Chocolate had been the fourth fighter to reign as World Colored Heavyweight Champion while the second George Godfrey was the 20th fighter to hold the colored heavyweight title.

The colored heavyweight title was recognized due to the color bar in pro boxing in the 19th and early 20th centuries, when white champions drew the color line and would not defend the title against a black man. In the heavyweight division, the color bar was adamantly defended by Old Chocolate Godfrey's contemporary, "The Boston Strong Boy", John L. Sullivan. Ironically, it remained in force even after colored heavyweight title holder Jack Johnson won the world's heavyweight title in 1908. Johnson never fought black opponents either, allegedly because such top promoters as Tex Rickard believed that a fight between two black boxers would not draw at the gate. He was also the only man to ever defeat the 7 foot 9 inch giant Gogea Mitu.

Because of the color bar in the heavyweight division that continued until the rise of Joe Louis in the 1930s, the second Godfrey Williams never fought for the world heavyweight championship, like the man he had named himself after. He did win the International Boxing Union's version of the world heavyweight championship in 1935, two years before Louis became the second black man to become the universally recognized world heavyweight champ.

Boxing career
Boxing's second George Godfrey fought ring legend Sam Langford three times. Godfrey, who was 6 ft 3 in (1.91 m) tall and weighed between 220 and 260 lb (118 kg) during his career, dwarfed the 5 ft 8 in (1.73 m) Langford. Despite his advantage in size, height and weight, Godfrey was knocked out in two of the three matches in 1920 and 1921. He did manage a draw in his first bout with Langford in 1920.

Godfrey is said to have been instructed by promoters on a number of occasions to carry opponents if he wanted to receive more important fights. He was outpointed over 10 rounds by future champion Jack Sharkey in 1926, was also outpointed by contender Johnny Risko in 10 rounds in 1928, but outpointed Paolino Uzcudun in 1928.

World Colored Heavyweight Championship
Godfrey twice won the World Colored Heavyweight Championship. When Harry Wills was stripped of the title after losing by disqualification to Jack Sharkey on October 12, 1926, Godfrey defeated Larry Gains on November 8, 1926, at Broadway Auditorium in Buffalo, New York, on a TKO in the sixth round. Godfrey made three defenses of the title, which was retaken by Gaines on August 15, 1928, in Buffalo when Godfrey was disqualified.

The title was later vacated, and Godfrey won it a second time on August 24, 1931, in Toronto, Canada, when he defeated Seal Harris, whom he knocked out in the second round. He defended it three more times before losing to Obidiah "Obie" Walker on points in a 10-round fight held in Philadelphia on October 9, 1933. In the interim between the two titles, he fought Bearcat Wright for the "Black Heavyweight Championship" on December 19, 1930, in Atlanta, Georgia, but the 10-round fight was a draw.

Carnera fight
He was disqualified against future champion Primo Carnera in 1930. 
 
Many observers considered the 1930 Carnera fight to be fixed. Godfrey was disqualified in the sixth round when he was clearly getting the better of Carnera.

Time magazine, in an October 5, 1931, cover story on Carnera before he won the heavyweight title, commented on his odd career.

Since his arrival in the U. S., backed by a group of prosperous but shady entrepreneurs, Carnera's career has been less glorious than fantastic. ... Suspicion concerning the Monster's abilities became almost universal when another adversary, Bombo Chevalier, stated that one of his own seconds had threatened to kill him unless he lost to Carnera. Against the huge, lazy, amiable Negro George Godfrey (249 lb.), he won on a foul. But only one of 33 U. S. opponents has defeated Monster Carnera—fat, slovenly Jim Maloney, whom Sharkey beat five years ago. In a return fight, at Miami last March, Carnera managed to outpoint Maloney.

Godfrey had knocked out Maloney (who went on to beat Carnera after the latter's defeat of Godfrey in 1927).

IBU title
Godfrey would go to Europe later in his career and win the International Boxing Union World Heavyweight title. In late 1934, the IBU had ordered world champion Max Baer to defend his title against the reigning European champion, Pierre Charles of Belgium. When Baer instead opted to fight James J. Braddock, they withdrew recognition of him as champion.

Subsequently, the IBU matched Charles with Godfrey for their version of the title with the fight taking place in Brussels, Belgium on October 2, 1935. Godfrey won a fifteen round decision on points, but did not press any claim to the championship and it was inactive for the next two years. The IBU then recognized Baer's successor Braddock, as champion.

Death and honors
Godfrey died on August 13, 1947, in his home and was found a week later, aged 50. His funeral was attended by many boxers, including former heavyweight champion Jack Dempsey, former light heavyweight champion Jack Root, former middleweight champion Gorilla Jones, and others included footballer Dick Donald and boxing manager Mike McNulty.

In 2003, Godfrey was named to the Ring magazine's list of 100 greatest punchers of all time.

In 2007, he was elected into the International Boxing Hall of Fame.

Godfrey had a brief career in movies making five motion pictures from 1926 to 1937. His most famous role was as the cook in Paramount Pictures's 1926 Old Ironsides. His final role was as himself in MGM's Big City which starred Spencer Tracy.

References

|-

1897 births
1947 deaths
Boxers from Alabama
Heavyweight boxers
African-American boxers
World colored heavyweight boxing champions
American male boxers
20th-century African-American sportspeople